Javad Jahanghirzadeh (born 11 August 1966) is an Iranian politician.

Jahanghirzadeh was born in Urmia, West Azerbaijan. He is a member of the 7th, 8th and 9th Islamic Consultative Assembly from the electorate of Urmia with Nader Ghazipour and Abed Fattahi. he is member of Iran-China Friendship society and parliamentary relations committee between Iran and EU  Jahanghirzadeh won with 108,133 (27.71%) votes. Currently he is the ambassador of Iran to the Republic of Azerbaijan.

References

External links
 Jahanghirzadeh Website

People from Urmia
Deputies of Urmia
Ambassadors of Iran to Azerbaijan
Living people
1966 births
Members of the 9th Islamic Consultative Assembly
Members of the 8th Islamic Consultative Assembly
Members of the 7th Islamic Consultative Assembly
Academic staff of Urmia University